Christine Muzio (10 May 1951 – 29 November 2018) was a French fencer. She won a silver medal in the women's team foil event at the 1976 Summer Olympics and a gold in the same event at the 1980 Summer Olympics.

References

External links
 

1951 births
2018 deaths
French female foil fencers
Olympic fencers of France
Fencers at the 1976 Summer Olympics
Fencers at the 1980 Summer Olympics
Olympic gold medalists for France
Olympic silver medalists for France
Olympic medalists in fencing
People from Creil
Medalists at the 1976 Summer Olympics
Medalists at the 1980 Summer Olympics
Sportspeople from Oise
20th-century French women